Ge Yang (born 26 September 1985) is a retired Chinese para table tennis player. Ge has played para table tennis since he was seven years old. He made his debut at the Paralympics in Athens in 2004 aged 20 and has competed in four Paralympic Games, winning six gold medals, one silver and one bronze.

Ge lost his lower right arm in a fireworks accident at age five.

References

1985 births
Chinese male table tennis players
Paralympic table tennis players of China
Medalists at the 2004 Summer Paralympics
Medalists at the 2008 Summer Paralympics
Medalists at the 2012 Summer Paralympics
Medalists at the 2016 Summer Paralympics
Table tennis players at the 2004 Summer Paralympics
Table tennis players at the 2008 Summer Paralympics
Table tennis players at the 2012 Summer Paralympics
Table tennis players at the 2016 Summer Paralympics
Table tennis players from Baoding
Paralympic gold medalists for China
Paralympic silver medalists for China
Paralympic bronze medalists for China
Paralympic medalists in table tennis
Living people
Chinese amputees